Bálint Lám (born May 14, 1992) is a Hungarian Greco-Roman wrestler.  He won silver medal at the 2017 European Wrestling Championships.

Major results

References

1992 births
Living people
Hungarian male sport wrestlers
Wrestlers at the 2015 European Games
Universiade medalists in wrestling
Universiade bronze medalists for Hungary
European Wrestling Championships medalists
Medalists at the 2013 Summer Universiade
Sport wrestlers from Budapest
21st-century Hungarian people